Moidu Padiyath or Moithu Padiyathu was an Indian novelist, screenplay writer, and director in Mollywood.

Early life 
Padiyath was born in 1931. His place of birth was Eriyad, near Kodungallur town, Trichur district, Kerala.

Career 
Padiyath narrated stories from his own family history, covering subjects such as his Muslim family's backward caste, family subjects such as biased performance, harassment between mother in-laws, daughter in-laws, sister in-law, divorce, multiple spouses, etc.

He gained entry into the cinema through the veteran director Kunchacko under the banner of Udaya Studio for whom he produced his controversial novel Umma. He furnished dozen of novels rewritten as screenplays such as Kuttikkuppayam, Kuppivala, Yatheem, Mylanji, Manithali, Maniyara and Kaalam Maari Kadha Maari, most of which gained commercial success. He directed a movie entitled Allahu Akbar.

His son Siddique Shameer followed in the same field.  Veteran film director Kamal and actor Bahadoor are Padiyath's relatives.

Padiyath is said in the Encyclopaedia of Indian Literature to have written for "the ordinary reader". He is described in A History of Malayalam Literature as "extraordinarily prolific".

He died in 1989.

Works

 The Cuckoo That Yearned to Sing (1958)

References

External links
മൊയ്തു പടിയത്ത് - Moidu Padiyath | M3DB.COM

Living people
Film people from Kerala
Malayalam screenwriters
Malayalam-language writers
Year of birth missing (living people)